Başer is a Turkish surname. Notable people with the surname include:

 Tansel Başer (born 1978), Australian-Turkish footballer
 Tevfik Başer (born 1951), Turkish-German film director
 Yusuf Başer (born 1980), Turkish karateka

Turkish-language surnames